Group A of the EuroBasket Women 2019 took place between 27 and 30 June 2019. The group consisted of Czech Republic, France, Montenegro and Sweden and played all games at Riga, Latvia.

Standings

All times are local (UTC+3).

Matches

Sweden vs Montenegro

France vs Czech Republic

Czech Republic vs Sweden

Montenegro vs France

Czech Republic vs Montenegro

Sweden vs France

References

External links
Official website

Group B
2018–19 in Swedish basketball
2018–19 in French basketball
2018–19 in Czech basketball
2018–19 in Montenegrin basketball